The 2016–17 Grand Canyon Antelopes women's basketball team represents Grand Canyon University in Phoenix, Arizona, during the 2016–17 NCAA Division I women's basketball season. It was head coach Trent May's tenth season at Grand Canyon. The Antelopes compete as members of the Western Athletic Conference and played their home games at GCU Arena. The 2016–17 season was year 4 of a 4-year transitional period for Grand Canyon from D2 to D1. In years 2–4 Grand Canyon is classified as a D1 school for scheduling purposes. They played a full conference schedule, and they could win the regular season conference title. However Grand Canyon couldn't participate in the conference tourney until the 2017–18 season, at which time they will also be able to enter the NCAA tournament, should they win the conference. Grand Canyon was eligible to participate in the WBI or WNIT should they be invited. They finished the season 15–12, 7–7 in WAC play to finish in fifth place.

On March 7, Trent May will not return as a head coach. He finished at Grand Canyon with a 10 year record of 195–96.

Roster

Schedule and Results

|-
!colspan=9 style="background:#522D80; color:white;"| Exhibition

|-
!colspan=9 style="background:#522D80; color:white;"| Non-conference regular season

|-
!colspan=9 style="background:#522D80; color:white;"| WAC regular season

See also 
2016–17 Grand Canyon Antelopes men's basketball team

References 

Grand Canyon Antelopes women's basketball seasons
Grand Canyon